Shane Charles Getkate (born 2 October 1991) is a South African-born Irish cricketer. Getkate was born with Wolff–Parkinson–White syndrome, which caused him to collapse on field during an under-19 game in June 2011. In January 2020, he was one of nineteen players to be awarded a central contract from Cricket Ireland, the first year in which all contracts were awarded on a full-time basis.

Domestic and T20 career
He made his Twenty20 cricket debut for Northern Knights in the 2017 Inter-Provincial Trophy on 26 May 2017. He made his List A debut for Northern Knights in the 2017 Inter-Provincial Cup on 29 May 2017. He made his first-class debut for Northern Knights in the 2017 Inter-Provincial Championship on 30 May 2017.

In April 2019, he was one of five cricketers to be awarded with an Emerging Player Contract by Cricket Ireland, ahead of the 2019 domestic season. In July 2019, he was selected to play for the Belfast Titans in the inaugural edition of the Euro T20 Slam cricket tournament. However, the following month the tournament was cancelled.

International career
In January 2019, he was named in Ireland's Twenty20 International (T20I) squads for the Oman Quadrangular Series and the series against Afghanistan in India. He made his T20I debut for Ireland against Oman on 13 February 2019, becoming Ireland's 700th international cap.

In June 2019, he was named in the Ireland Wolves squad for their home series against the Scotland A cricket team. Later the same month, he was named in Ireland's squad for their series against Zimbabwe. He made his One Day International (ODI) debut for Ireland against Zimbabwe on 1 July 2019.

In September 2019, he was named in Ireland's squad for the 2019 ICC T20 World Cup Qualifier tournament in the United Arab Emirates. In February 2021, Getkate was named in the Ireland Wolves' squad for their tour to Bangladesh. In September 2021, Getkate was named in Ireland's provisional squad for the 2021 ICC Men's T20 World Cup.

References

External links
 
 

1991 births
Living people
Irish cricketers
Ireland One Day International cricketers
Ireland Twenty20 International cricketers
Northern Knights cricketers
North West Warriors cricketers
Irish people of South African descent
Cricketers from Durban